Toro, also known as Turkwam, is a Plateau language of Nigeria. It has lost the nominal affix system characteristic of the Niger–Congo family.

Toro is spoken in Turkwam village, located northeast of Wamba. The language is still vital, with no immediate endangerment. There are about 3,000 to 4,000 people in Turkwam village. The plural form of 'Toro people' is à-Toro-mbò). The Toro people are culturally identify with the Kantana people, who speak a Jarawan Bantu language.

References

Languages of Nigeria
Alumic languages